The Tattooist of Auschwitz is a 2018 Holocaust novel by New Zealand novelist Heather Morris. The book tells the story of how Slovakian Jew Lale Sokolov, who was imprisoned at Auschwitz in 1942, fell in love with a girl he was tattooing at the concentration camp. The story is based on the real lives of Sokolov and his wife, Gita Furman. There has been mixed criticism towards the book, with some complimenting the novel’s compelling story based on real-life events, while claims of factual inaccuracies that bring into question miseducation around historical events has been critiqued by the Auschwitz Memorial Research Center.

As of October 2019, the novel has sold more than three million copies around the world. 61,391 copies of The Tattooist of Auschwitz were sold in 2018 in Ireland. In 2018, it was the #1 New York Times Bestseller and #1 International Bestseller.

Background 
The book, which was Morris’ debut novel, was originally written as a screenplay. Morris was proposed the idea of telling the story of Lale Sokolov by a mutual friend of hers and Lale’s son, after Lale’s wife Gita died. Morris met with Lale for three years until his death in 2006, to hear his story about his time with Gita in Auschwitz and take notes for her screenplay. During those meetings with Lale, he told Morris about the trauma, pain and survivor guilt he experienced.

Six years after the first meeting with Lale, Morris’ sister-in-law suggested writing the story as a book.

Plot 

Told from the perspective of Lale Sokolov, the story follows his journey as a prisoner of Auschwitz concentration camp during World War II. After being forcibly transported on a long journey on a livestock train with other Jewish prisoners, Lale arrives at Auschwitz II-Birkenau work camp where, within his first night, he witnesses two men killed by the SS.

Lale adjusts to his new life as a Jewish prisoner, which involves witnessing gassings of fellow prisoners and becoming ill with typhus. While Lale is ill, the current tattooist of the camp, Pepan, takes interest in him and arranges for him to become his apprentice. Lale endures the labour of tattooing new prisoners to enable his further survival.

Lale briefly meets a beautiful, young woman while tattooing her arm upon her entry to the camp, and he experiences love at first sight. Lale becomes the main tattooist after Pepan disappears. Lale asks the SS officer in charge of him, Baretksi, for an assistant, just as Pepan had asked that he be his assistant. Baretski picks out a young prisoner named Leon. 

Lale uses his relationship with Baretski to gain increased privileges within the camp, including the ability to communicate with the beautiful woman he met earlier, Gita. Gita works in one of the camp warehouses that houses the confiscated belongings of prisoners and often sneaks valuable items to Lale. Lale then risks his own life to exchange jewels and money with a sympathetic German worker for who comes to the camp each day for medicine and items of clothing to help prisoners who are suffering or gain favours with the SS. For example, while Gita is ill with typhus, Lale brings her medicine and promises to one day start a family with her once she is well again.

The SS officers begin acting nervous and impulsive upon news that the Russian army is advancing. Camp documents are destroyed. Many prisoners are transferred out of Auschwitz, including Gita who in the rush tells Lale her surname is Furman. Lale is transferred to Mauthausen in Austria and then soon to another camp near Vienna. Lale escapes from the camp through a hole in the fence and, upon being found by Russian soldiers, is forced to work at a chalet that serves as headquarters for Russian soldiers due to his ability to speak both German and Russian. Every day he is escorted to town by a Russian soldier to procure young, attractive German women to come to parties at the chalet in the evening. He pays them with money and jewels. One day he is told that his escort is no longer necessary and he can take the car into town alone. Once there, he escapes and makes his way to his hometown to find his sister alive, that his parents are still missing and that his older brother has died.

Meanwhile, Gita has escaped her transport with three Polish women before making her way to Bratislava, Slovakia.

Lale then heads to Bratislava to find Gita, knowing that many Slovakian prisoners are being sent there. He waits two weeks at a train station and then spots her in a street. The pair kneel down and tell each other they love each other. Lale asks if Gita will marry him and she agrees.

Characters

Lale Sokolov 
The narrator of the book is 25-year-old Slovakian Jew from Krompachy Lale (Lali) Sokolov, who meets a young woman while serving as the Tätowierer in Auschwitz II-Birkenau from 1942 until 1945. He falls in love with the woman, Gita, during his years of imprisonment, and vows to marry and start a family with her once they are free. Lale consistently puts himself in danger to help his friends and himself survive while in Auschwitz-Birkenau labour camp.

Gita 
Gita is a young Jewish woman from Slovakia who meets Lale in Auschwitz II-Birkenau. She meets Lale as he tattoos her identification number on her arm. She and Lale meet with each other regularly and eventually agree they will remain together once they are free from imprisonment. Gita falls ill with typhus and is hidden from guards by her friends to save her from being sent to the gas chambers. Gita's friends, Ivana and Dana, and Lale keeps Gita alive using various tactics.

Cilka 
Cilka is Gita’s friend who she meets while working in the Birkenau administration building. Unlike most other prisoners, Cilka is not made to shave her head. She is also forced to be a mistress to Lagerführer (later Schutzhaftlagerführer), Johann Schwarzhuber, the commandant of Auschwitz, and is regularly raped. The only favour Cilka ever asks of Schwarzhuber is to transfer Lale out of Block 31 where he was being tortured. This dangerous act saves Lale’s life.

Pepan 
Pepan is the main tattooist at Auschwitz before Lale takes over, and aids Lale in regaining his health after seeing Aron plead with an officer to take Lale off the cart of dying prisoners. He believes Lale to be an extraordinary person and worthy of saving. He takes in Lale as his assistant tattooist and teaches him how to deal with and bargain with the officers to survive. It is suggested that when Pepan disappears he is being taken to be murdered.

Jakub 
Jakub is an American-Jew who while visiting family in Poland was captured and taken to Auschwitz II-Birkenau. He meets Lale while being tattooed on his forearm, and signals he is starving. Lale is able to sneak Jakub rations of food. Later on, when Lale is taken to be tortured, and finds that Jakub is his delegated torturer, Jakub is able to return the favour and save Lale’s life.

Baretski 
Baretski is the Nazi SS Officer in charge of Lale. Their relationship grows with increased trust throughout the novel, with Baretski even giving Lale advice on how to stay safe. They share tips between each other on their own relationships with women, and risk their own lives to help each other on multiple occasions. Despite this relationship, Lale still deems Baretski a risk due to his random acts of murder and torture to other prisoners.

Aron 
Aron is Lale’s bunkmate, whom he met while being transported to Auschwitz II-Birkenau. Aron helped save Lale’s life by pulling him from the cart of dying prisoners while Lale was sick with Typhus. Because of his selfless act in saving Lale’s life and lying to SS officers, he is taken away and never seen again.

Doctor Mengele 
Josef Mengele is the Doctor at Auschwitz who conducts torturous experiments on its prisoners. Mengele also castrated Leon, and often chose who was sent to the gas chambers.

Victor 
Victor is a paid labourer from Poland who gives Lale rations of food in exchange for valuables while visiting Auschwitz II-Birkenau to build crematoriums.

Leon 
Leon works with Lale as the assistant tattooer and is at one point taken by Doctor Mengele to be castrated. Leon was like a brother to Lale.

Genre and Style 
The Tattooist of Auschwitz fits into the genre of Holocaust fiction. Morris writes using simple, short sentences from a third-person point of view where Lale is the omniscient narrator and protagonist of the story.

According to Steve Walker, Morris "welds the historical events – and real people – on to a fictional frame."

The novel utilises many elements of the Romantic genre, specifically through the key plot line of Lale and Gita's love story.

The Tattooist of Auschwitz also fits into the Biographical genre. The novel is based on events in the real Lale Sokolov's life and represents the circumstances Lale and other characters in the story lived through.

Reception 
Timonthy Niedermann, writing in The New York Journal of Books, calls the novel “at once sobering and poignant, both weighted with unspeakable horrors and uplifted by the unique hope of love”. He felt that while the book lacks physical descriptions, and Morris is “vague about the specifics of the extermination process”, her depiction of humanity in the characters is a strength.

Wanda Witek-Malicka from the Auschwitz Memorial Research Center, writing in Memoria, offered historical criticism, questioning the novel’s factual inaccuracies and stating that the entire image of reality at Auschwitz displayed in the book is built on “exaggerations, misinterpretations and understatements”. She warns that those who read the Czech translation of the book may take its stories as fact, which the Memorial Center believe is "dangerous and disrespectful to history".

A key concern for the Auschwitz Memorial Research Center was Morris' claim that Gita's identification number tattooed on her arm was 34902, stating "we do not find any surviving documents with her personal data or relating to number 34902 issued in the women's series" and that a prisoner arriving at Auschwitz at the time Gita did could not have received such a high number. Witek-Malicka states that according to Gita's own testimony, her identification number was 4562. Witek-Malicka also rejects Morris' claim that Doctor Mengele conducted sterilisation tests on men in Auschwitz, and that in 1942 Lale gave Gita penicillin for her typhoid fever, because this antibiotic was not  widely available until after the war.

Hirsh, Láníček, Mitschke & Shields, writing in the Australian Journal of Jewish Studies, state that creative license is common, but that “Heather Morris’ steadfast reliance on conversations she shared with Lale Sokolov towards the end of his life have contributed to a simplification that narrows understanding of the reality of Auschwitz”. They note the flattening of the experiences of the character, Gita Furman, as an example of this simplification.

Television Adaptation 
The Creative Director of Synchronicity Films, Claire Mundell secured the rights to The Tattooist of Auschwitz after making a deal with Bonnier Books UK in 2018. The novel was set to be turned into a multi-part television series to be tentatively released in January 2020. However, there have been no further reports of this deal going ahead since September 2018. in 2023, Jonah Hauer-King and Anna Próchniak joined series

Translations 
By November 2018, the book had been translated into 17 languages. By September 2019, official translations of the book had been published in 47 languages. One of these translations is in Slovak, Lale's native language. Morris celebrated the launch of the Slovak version of the book in Krompachy in Eastern Slovakia, which is where Lale was born.

References 

2018 novels
21st-century New Zealand novels
Novels set in the 1940s
Novels set in Poland
Novels about the Holocaust